Sam Bornstein (1920 - 1990) was a British Trotskyist historian and activist.

Bornstein was a member of the ILP Guild of Youth, but eventually moved towards Trotskyist ideas and joined the Workers International League, helping to build their branch in Stepney.

With Al Richardson, published three books on the history of Trotskyism in Britain through their "Socialist Platform" publishing house.  In 1988 they founded the journal Revolutionary History, dedicated to the history of the anti-Stalinist left.

Publications

 Two Steps Back: Communists and the Wider Labour Movement, 1939-1945 (with Al Richardson), Socialist Platform, London 1982.
 Against the Stream: A History of the Trotskyist Movement in Britain 1924-1938 (with Al Richardson), Socialist Platform, London 1986.
 The War and the International: A History of the British Trotskyist Movement, 1937-1949 (with Al Richardson), Socialist Platform, London 1986.

External links
Obituary by Sam Levy

References

1920 births
1990 deaths
British Trotskyists
British Marxist historians
Revolutionary Communist Party (UK, 1944) members
British Marxists
Historians of communism